Andreas Petropoulos (born February 11, 1994) is a Greek professional basketball player for AEK Athens of the Greek Basket League and the Basketball Champions League. He is a 1.96 m (6'5") tall swingman.

Professional career
Petropoulos began his pro career in 2013, with the Greek 2nd Division club Pagrati. In 2014, he debuted in the top-tier level Greek Basket League, with Panionios. He joined Olympiacos' new reserve team of the Greek 2nd Division, Olympiacos B, for the 2019–20 season. Petropoulos averaged 12.2 points, 3.8 rebounds and 1.7 assists per game. On August 27, 2020, he signed with Ionikos Nikaias. 

On August 13, 2021, Petropoulos signed a one-year contract with AEK Athens. On April 1, 2022, he renewed his contract through 2024. In 23 league games, he averaged 4.1 points, 2.5 rebounds, 0.6 assists and 0.5 steals, playing around 18 minutes per contest.

References

External links
Eurobasket.com Profile
Greek Basket League Profile 
RealGM.com Profile
ProBallers.com Profile

1994 births
Living people
AEK B.C. players
Doxa Lefkadas B.C. players
Greek men's basketball players
Ionikos Nikaias B.C. players
Kastorias B.C. players
Pagrati B.C. players
Panionios B.C. players
Olympiacos B.C. B players
Shooting guards
Small forwards